George Washington Carver High School was a public secondary school in Kannapolis, North Carolina. It served as the high school for black students from 1936 until the public schools were integrated in 1967.

History
The school was originally opened in 1923 as Centerview Colored School and was the first official school building for African-Americans in Kannapolis. In 1936, the buildings were augmented with an auditorium and an 8 room brick addition, and renamed after George Washington Carver. The school served students in grades K-12. The largest graduating class, 60 students, graduated in 1965. After integration, the buildings were used as an elementary school. The structures were mostly destroyed by fire in the 1970s. A small portion of the 1936 building survived and is used for offices and as a career center. From 1980 to 2005, the site was used as a middle school. In 2017 a new Carver Elementary School was opened on the site.

References

Historically segregated African-American schools in North Carolina
Public high schools in North Carolina
Historically black schools